The 2017 Svenska Cupen final was played on 13 April 2017. The match was played at Jämtkraft Arena, Östersund, the home ground of Östersunds FK, determined in a draw on 19 March 2017 after the semi-finals.

The Allsvenskan clubs Östersunds FK and IFK Norrköping contested the final, with the winner earning a place in the second qualifying round of the 2017–18 UEFA Europa League. Östersunds FK played their first ever Svenska Cupen final. IFK Norrköping played their first final since 1994 and their 11th in total. Östersunds FK won their first Svenska Cupen title after defeating IFK Norrköping 4–1. This was the first time a Svenska Cupen final was played on artificial turf.

Route to the final

Note: In all results below, the score of the finalist is given first.

Match

Details

References

Svenska Cupen Final
Svenska Cupen Final 2017
Svenska Cupen Final 2017
Svenska Cupen Finals
Svenska Cupen Final
Svenska Cupen Final 2017